Polly is a 1989 American made-for-television musical film adapted from the book Pollyanna by Eleanor H. Porter featuring an all African-American cast (with the exception of Celeste Holm). It was directed and choreographed by Debbie Allen, starring Keshia Knight Pulliam, Phylicia Rashad and also featured the final performance of actress Butterfly McQueen. Polly was originally broadcast on NBC on November 12, 1989.

Plot 
Set in Alabama during the 1950s, Polly Whittier, an orphan who is sent to live with her aunt Polly Harrington, who is a descendant of the founding family of a small Southern town (also called Harrington) during the segregation era. A key point in dividing the town is a ravine which has an unrepaired bridge which burned down many years ago, and no one knows how it started and is suspicious of everyone else. Polly is able to convince people to look at the bright side of things, but tragedy strikes when Polly falls two stories from a tree, suffering a spinal injury.

Polly proved to be a ratings hit and a sequel, Polly: Comin' Home!, followed in 1990. Both of these films are available on DVD exclusively from the Disney Movie Club and Disney Movie Rewards.

Cast 
 Keshia Knight Pulliam as Polly Whittier
 Phylicia Rashad as Aunt Polly Harrington
 Dorian Harewood as Dr. Robert Shannon
 Barbara Montgomery as Mrs. Conley
 T. K. Carter as George Dodds
 Vanessa Bell Calloway as Nancy Palmer
 Brandon Quintin Adams as Jimmy Bean
 Butterfly McQueen as Miss Priss
 Larry Riley as Reverend Gillis
 Brock Peters as Mr. Pendergast
 Celeste Holm as Miss Snow
 Ken Page  as Mayor Warren

Musical numbers 
Overture
By Your Side- Polly
Honey Ain't Got Nothin' On You- Polly, Nancy, & Girls
Sweet Little Angel Eyes- Jimmy Bean, Polly, George, Nancy, & Kids
Something More- Ms. Harrington
Shine A Light- Robert, George, & Mayor Warren
Rainbow Maker- Polly, Ms. Harrington, & Nancy
Stand Up- Rev. Gillis, Robert, Polly, Nancy, Jimmy Bean, George, & Ensemble 
Finale- Ensemble

Soundtrack

The original television soundtrack recording of Polly was released on CD and cassette tape by Walt Disney Records on November 30, 1989.

Track listing
"Overture" (2:36)
"By Your Side" – Polly (2:30)
"Honey Ain't Got Nothin' On You" – Polly, Nancy & Girls (2:07)
"Sweet Little Angel Eyes" – Jimmy Bean, Polly, George, Nancy & Children (2:17)
"Shine A Light" – Mayor Warren, Dr. Shannon & George (2:35)
"Something More" – Aunt Polly (2:24)
"Rainbow Theme" (0:35)
"Rainbow Maker" – Polly, Nancy & Aunt Polly (2:00)
"Delivering Baskets" (0:54)
"Stand Up" – Reverend Gillis, Dr. Shannon & Congregation (4:28)
"At the Bazaar" (1:40)
"Swingin' Sisters" (2:10)
"A Prayer/Polly's Day" (2:00)
"Finale" (2:50)

Home media 
Both Polly and Polly: Comin' Home were released on VHS by Walt Disney Home Video in 1990. Around 2000 the two movies were released on DVD on Disney Movie Club Exclusive.

Award nominations

External links 
 
 

1989 television films
1989 films
1980s musical films
African-American musical films
American musical films
NBC network original films
Disney television films
Films based on children's books
Films based on American novels
Films set in the 1950s
Films set in Alabama
Films directed by Debbie Allen
Films scored by Joel McNeely
1980s American films